The 2003 AFF U-18 Youth Championship was held from 7 June to 18 June 2003 and was co-hosted by Myanmar and Vietnam.  This was the inaugural edition of the tournament.

Participating nations

Tournament

Group stage

Group A 
All matches played in Yangon, Myanmar
All times are Myanmar Standard Time (MST) - UTC+6:30

Group B 
All matches played in Ho Chi Minh City, Vietnam
All times are Indochina Time (ICT) - UTC+7

Knockout stage 
All matches played in Yangon, Myanmar
All times are Myanmar Standard Time (MST) - UTC+6:30

Bracket

Semi-finals

Third place play-off

Final

Winner

Goalscorers

References 
King, Ian "ASEAN U-18 Championship 2003" RSSSF.
"1st  ASEAN U-18 Championship 2003" ThaiFootball.com

Under
Aff U-18 Youth Championship, 2003
AFF U-18
2003
2003